The Innviertler FussballCup known as the Innviertler Cup, is an is a football tournament held by the Austrian Football Association for regional teams that occurs every 2 years. UFC PTA are the current champions.

History 

The tournament was first held in 1959. It featured an 18 team two leg qualifying round with 11 teams qualifying for the 2nd round. 5 new teams joined in at the 2nd round to create a 16 team two leg round. The 3rd round had 8 teams in a two leg round and the semi finals and finals were both single leg rounds. In the finals, SK Altheim defeated Grieskirchen while Riedau beat Eberschwang to finish in 3rd place. The two leg format was dropped permanently after.

The tournament grew in various years, ranging from 32 to 74 teams for some of the 1980's editions. The 2022 edition of the tournament had 32 teams competing.

Tournament winners

References

External links
 Official Website
 Official Facebook

Football cup competitions in Austria
1959 establishments in Austria
Recurring sporting events established in 1959